The Hyundai A engine also known by its engine code D4CB is a 2.5L diesel 4-cylinder automobile engine produced by Hyundai Motor Group from 2002 up to the present. This is one of the first diesel engines designed and developed solely by Hyundai without any license from any other car manufacturer.

The A line of engines feature  four cylinders compacted graphite iron block and aluminum cylinder head unit, with chain driven dual overhead camshafts operating four valves per cylinder.

As the older A models were rated below their intended Euro rating (A I series rated for Euro 3 is taxed for Euro 2, while earlier A II series rated for Euro 4 is taxed for Euro 3), to achieve the intended Euro 5 emission and taxation compliancy, the later A II series from 2011-onwards is fitted with a standard Diesel particulate filter to meet the intended emissions standards.

A I series
The  A I was produced from 2002 through 2006. It was available with either 4-speed automatic or 5-speed manual transmissions.

Applications
 Hyundai Starex (2002–2006)
 Hyundai Porter (2006–2012)
 Kia Sorento (2002–2008)
 Kia Bongo (2006–2012)

A II series
The  A II is produced since 2007. This series saw the introduction of a Variable geometry turbocharger as an improvement from the initial traditional turbocharger of the A I while some later models shifted to a Wastegate instead for some markets.

Sometime in 2008 through 2021 some engines are designated as D4CB-L A II which was a low-power version that is rated only for  instead of the usual . 2011 models and beyond are also equipped with a standard particulate filter for emission compliance purposes.

Applications 
 Hyundai Starex (2007–2021)
 Hyundai H350 (2014–present)
 Hyundai Porter (2013–present)
 Kia Sorento (2006–2008)
 Kia Bongo (2013–present)

Specifications

See also
 List of Hyundai engines

References

External links

A
Diesel engines by model
Straight-four engines